Flexibility may refer to:

 Flexibility, the ability of a material to deform  elastically and return to its original shape when the applied  stress is removed 
 Flexibility (anatomy), the distance of motion of a joint, which may be increased by stretching
 Flexibility (engineering), in the field of engineering systems design, designs that can adapt when external changes occur
 Flexibility (personality), the range of different appropriate behavioural responses a person can make in situations that they face.
 Cognitive flexibility, the ability to switch between thinking about two different concepts, and to think about multiple concepts simultaneously
 Labour market flexibility 
 "Flexibility", a song by Miss Kittin & The Hacker first published as the seventh song of their 2001 album First Album
 Flexibility (abstract algebra), a property of some non-associative algebras

See also 
 Flexible (disambiguation)